Peter McGregor (born 28 December 1941) is a New Zealand former cricketer. He played first-class cricket for Auckland, Central Districts, Northern Districts and Wellington between 1960 and 1975.

See also
 List of Auckland representative cricketers

References

External links
 

1941 births
Living people
New Zealand cricketers
Auckland cricketers
Central Districts cricketers
Northern Districts cricketers
Wellington cricketers
Cricketers from Auckland